Frank J. Rodriguez, Sr. (March 28, 1920 – February 9, 2007) was an American politician.

Rodriguez was born in Sheridan, Wyoming. In 1922, he moved with his family to Saint Paul, Minnesota and graduated from Humboldt Senior High School in 1940, in Saint Paul. Rodriguez worked in construction and was involved with the labor union movement. He was also involved with the Saint Paul Housing Authority. Rodriguez served in the Minnesota House of Representatives from 1979 to 1984 and was a Democrat. He died from a heart attack at United Hospital in Saint Paul, Minnesota. He was the first Hispanic member of the Minnesota House of Representatives.

Notes

1920 births
2007 deaths
People from Sheridan, Wyoming
Politicians from Saint Paul, Minnesota
Democratic Party members of the Minnesota House of Representatives
20th-century American politicians